Astele ciliaris, common name the keeled Australian top shell, is a species of sea snail, a marine gastropod mollusk in the family Calliostomatidae.

Notes
Additional information regarding this species:
 Taxonomic remark: Some authors place this taxon in the subgenus Astele (Astele)

Description
The size of the shell varies between 25 mm and 40 mm. The imperforate shell has a pyramidal shape. It is fulvous, with red spots along the suture. It is transversely striate, decussated by very delicate striae. The base of the shell is plane. The flat whorls are margined below and ciliate-fimbriate above. The aperture ovate-lanceolate. The outer lip is callous-margined inside.

Distribution
This marine species occurs off Western Australia.

References

External links
 To Encyclopedia of Life
 To World Register of Marine Species
 

ciliaris
Gastropods described in 1843